William Cranston (18 January 1942 – January 2022) was a Scottish professional footballer who represented Blackpool, Preston North End and Oldham Athletic throughout his career.

Cranston was a centre back who began his career at Blackpool, making 33 league appearances between 1961 and 1965. He joined Preston North End during the 1964-65 season and made 87 League appearances and scored 1 goal for the Deepdale club. He was named the club's Official Player of the Year in 1969-70 despite only making 16 appearances that season. He moved to Oldham Athletic in 1970.

Later in his life, Cranston was a maintenance officer at Burnley Police Station.

Cranston died in January 2022, aged 79.

References
Specific

General
 
 Blackpool F.C.'s official website – Whatever happened to... 
 

1942 births
2022 deaths
Footballers from Kilmarnock
Blackpool F.C. players
Preston North End F.C. players
Oldham Athletic A.F.C. players
Scottish footballers
Association football central defenders
English Football League players